Husøy Chapel is a chapel of the Church of Norway in Senja Municipality in Troms og Finnmark county, Norway. It is located on the island-village of Husøy, just off the coast of the island of Senja. It is an annex chapel for the Lenvik parish which is part of the Senja prosti (deanery) in the Diocese of Nord-Hålogaland. The white, wood and brick chapel was built in a long church style in 1957. The chapel seats about 100 people.

See also
List of churches in Nord-Hålogaland

References

Senja
Churches in Troms
Brick churches in Norway
20th-century Church of Norway church buildings
Churches completed in 1957
1957 establishments in Norway
Long churches in Norway